is the sixth single by Japanese music trio Candies. Written by Kazuya Senke and Yūsuke Hoguchi, the single was released on June 1, 1975.

The song peaked at No. 18 on Oricon's singles chart and sold over 98,000 copies.

Track listing 
All lyrics are written by Kazuya Senke; all music is written and arranged by Yūsuke Hoguchi.

Chart positions

References

External links 
 
 
 

1975 singles
1975 songs
Japanese-language songs
Candies (group) songs
Sony Music Entertainment Japan singles